Arthur Paul Mattuck (June 11, 1930 – October 8, 2021) was an emeritus professor of mathematics at the Massachusetts Institute of Technology.  He may be best known for his 1998 book, Introduction to Analysis and his differential equations video lectures featured on MIT's OpenCourseWare.

Mattuck was a student of Emil Artin at Princeton University, where he completed his PhD in 1954.

Recognition
In 2012 he became a fellow of the American Mathematical Society.

Personal life
From 1959 to 1977 Mattuck was married to chemist Joan Berkowitz. Mattuck is quoted extensively in Sylvia Nasar's biography of John Nash, A Beautiful Mind.

He was the brother of the physicist Richard Mattuck.

He died on October 8, 2021, at age of 91. He was survived by his daughter Rosemary and her partner Jeffrey Broadman, and three nephews (Allan, Robin, and Martin).

References

External links
Differential Equations video lectures by Prof. Arthur Mattuck
Prof. Arthur Mattuck Home Page
"The Unofficial 18.02/18.03 Quote Book"

1930 births
2021 deaths
People from Brooklyn
American textbook writers
American male non-fiction writers
20th-century American mathematicians
21st-century American mathematicians
Swarthmore College alumni
Massachusetts Institute of Technology School of Science  faculty
Fellows of the American Mathematical Society